Twink  may refer to:
 Twink (gay slang), a term for a young or young-looking gay or bisexual man
 Twink (home perm), a British brand of hair product once produced by Elida
 Twink (internet slang), a role-playing game player who engages in twinking
 Twink (musician) or John Charles Edward Alder (born 1944), British singer and drummer
 Adele King or Twink (born 1951), Irish entertainer
 Hollywood Stars or the Twinks, an American minor league baseball team
 Twink, a character from Rainbow Brite
 Twink, a character in Paper Mario
 Twink, a brand of correction fluid and a generic term for correction fluid in New Zealand and Fiji

People with the given name
 Twink Caplan (born 1947), American actress, comedian, and producer
 Twink Twining (1894–1973), Major League Baseball pitcher

See also 
 Twinkie (disambiguation)

fr:Twink